The Kastles Stadium at The Wharf was a tennis stadium on the Southwest Waterfront in Washington, D.C. Built in 2011, the stadium was the home venue for the Washington Kastles tennis team. The stadium was opened on June 14, 2011, with a ribbon-cutting ceremony attended by Billie Jean King, Ilana Kloss, District of Columbia mayor Vincent Gray, and others. The Kastles opened their 2011 season on July 5 at the stadium playing against the Kansas City Explorers.

Following the Kastles' 2013 season, the stadium was closed to make way for the redevelopment of Washington's waterfront area. The Kastles moved to the Charles E. Smith Center for the 2014 season.

References

External links
Washington Kastles website

Defunct sports venues in Washington, D.C.
Demolished buildings and structures in Washington, D.C.
Demolished sports venues in the United States
Tennis venues in Washington, D.C.
Sports venues completed in 2011
Sports venues demolished in 2014
2011 establishments in Washington, D.C.
2014 disestablishments in Washington, D.C.